The Barnes Opening (sometimes called Gedult's Opening) is a chess opening where White opens with:
1. f3

The opening is named after Thomas Wilson Barnes (1825–1874), an English player who had eight wins over Paul Morphy, including one game where Barnes answered 1.e4 with 1...f6, known as the Barnes Defence.

Along with several other uncommon first moves, it is classified under the code A00 (irregular openings or uncommon openings) in the Encyclopaedia of Chess Openings.

Strategy 
Of the twenty possible first moves in chess, author and grandmaster Edmar Mednis argues that 1.f3 is the worst. Grandmaster Benjamin Finegold teaches "Never play f3".  In his text on openings, Paul van der Sterren considered 1. f3 beneath mention by name: 

The move does exert influence over the central square e4, but the same or more ambitious goals can be achieved with almost any other first move. The move 1.f3 does not  a piece, opens no  for pieces, and actually hinders the development of White's  by denying it its most natural square, f3. It also weakens White's  pawn structure, opens the e1–h4 diagonal against White's uncastled king, and opens the g1–a7 diagonal against White's potential kingside castling position.

Since 1.f3 is a poor move, it is not played often. Nonetheless, it is probably not the rarest opening move. After 1.f3 e5 some players even continue with the nonsensical 2.Kf2, one of several sequences of opening moves known as the Bongcloud Attack. It can also be known as the Fried Fox Attack, Wandering King Opening, The Hammerschlag, Tumbleweed, the Pork Chop Opening, or the Half Bird as it is often called in the United Kingdom, due to its opening move f3 being half that of the f4 employed in Bird's Opening. One example of this is the game Simon Williams beating Martin Simons in the last round of the British Championship 1999, where Williams had nothing to play for. In 2020, Magnus Carlsen played 2.Kf2 against Wesley So in a blitz game, for the psychological effect. So commented, "It's hard to forget the game when someone plays f3 and Kf2 and just crushes you. That's so humiliating." Also played is 2.e4, called the King's Head Opening.

If Black replies 1...e5, the game might proceed into a passive line known as the Blue Moon Defence. It usually occurs after the moves 1.f3 e5 2.Nh3 d5 3.Nf2 (avoiding 3...Bxh3 4.gxh3 weakening the kingside) 3...Nf6 4.e3 Nc6 5.Be2 Bc5 6.0-0 0-0.

If White plays poorly and leaves too many  against their king after 2.Kf2, they might be quickly checkmated. One example: 1.f3 d5 2.Kf2 e5 (Black places two pawns in the centre to prepare for quick development) 3.e4 Bc5+ 4.Kg3 Qg5#.

Fool's mate 

The Barnes Opening can lead to the fool's mate: 1.f3 e5 2.g4 Qh4#. Of all of White's legal moves after 1.f3 e5, only one allows mate in one, while another, 2.h3, allows mate in two: 2...Qh4+ 3.g3 Qxg3#.

See also 
Fool's mate
Barnes Defence
List of chess openings
List of chess openings named after people

References

Bibliography

 

Chess openings